The eastern ghost frog (Heleophryne orientalis) is a species of frog in the family Heleophrynidae.

It is endemic to Western Cape Province, South Africa. Its natural habitats are forest patches surrounded by mountain fynbos heathland. Adult frogs live near slow- to swift flowing perennial mountain streams in isolated canyons. They are typical sit-and-wait predators which hunt at night near to the splash zone of the mountain streams. Breeding takes place in fast-flowing, perennial streams. Clutches of 120–190 eggs are laid extra aquatic under moss-covered rocks. Like many frogs, their muscles and internal organs are visible due to their lower body being transparent. This species is the most well know in terms of anatomy in their taxon. The distinguishing factors are seen largely in tadpoles because of their unique pigmentation compared to the rest of the Heleophrynids. Their tadpoles take two years to complete their development and possess unique larval features such as the appearance of both the admandibular and the adrostral cartilage.

The eastern ghost frog is locally a common species that is not significantly threatened, but is locally impacted by introduced species.

References

Heleophryne
Endemic amphibians of South Africa
Amphibians described in 1946
Taxa named by Vivian Frederick Maynard FitzSimons
Taxonomy articles created by Polbot
Fauna of South Africa
Endemic fauna of South Africa